"Mutual Admiration Society" is a popular song published in 1956 from the Broadway musical Happy Hunting. The song's tune was written by Harold Karr, the lyrics by Matt Dubey.

Notable covers
 1956, duet by Ethel Merman and Virginia Gibson, original Broadway version
 1956, solo by Teresa Brewer, best-selling top-40 version
 1956, duet by Jaye P. Morgan and Eddy Arnold, reached no. 47 on the chart

External links

References

1956 songs
Teresa Brewer songs
Songs from musicals
Vocal duets